Maisons-Laffitte is a commune in the Yvelines department in the northern Île-de-France region of France. It is a part of the affluent outer suburbs of northwestern Paris,  from its centre. In 2018, it had a population of 23,611.

Maisons-Laffitte is famous for the Château de Maisons-Laffitte, built by architect François Mansart in the 17th century. Maisons-Laffitte is also known for its horse racing track, the Maisons-Laffitte Racecourse, which is why the town is known as the "cité du cheval" and compared with Newmarket in the United Kingdom.

History
Originally called Maisons-sur-Seine (meaning "Houses upon Seine"), the commune was officially renamed Maisons-Laffitte in 1882 in honour of banker Jacques Laffitte who financed the housing developments on the estate of the Château de Maisons-Laffitte.

The Château de Maisons-Laffitte has a secret passage to what once used to be part of the Château de Maisons-Laffitte but which is now a school - Collège de l'Ermitage.

Population

Transport
Maisons-Laffitte is served by Maisons-Laffitte station on Paris RER line A and on the Transilien Paris-Saint-Lazare suburban rail line.

Notable residents
Pape-Philippe Amagou, basketball player
Grégory Baugé, cyclist
Eugène Louis Bouvier, zoologist
Jean Cocteau, writer, filmmaker, and artist
Jerzy Giedroyc, founder and editor of a leading Polish-émigré literary-political journal, Kultura
Philippe Jaroussky, opera singer
Coralie Lassource, handball player
René Le Roy (1898 – 1985), classical flautist
Odd Nerdrum, painter
Randy de Puniet, motorcycle racer
Anne Queffélec, pianist
Emma Watson (until the age of 5), actress
James Winkfield, jockey, horse trainer
Ghislaine Maxwell, British socialite known for her association with financier and underage sex trafficker Jeffrey Epstein

Education
Public schools:
 Six preschools/nurseries (maternelles): Bois-Bonnet, Clos-Lainé, Cocteau, Colbert, La Renarde, Montebello
 Four elementary schools: Jehan Alain/André Ledreux, Colbert, Le Prieuré, Mansart
 Junior high schools (collèges): Jean Cocteau and Le Prieuré
 Senior high schools/sixth-form colleges: Lycée Évariste Galois (Sartrouville) and Lycée Les Pierres Vives (Carrières sur Seine)

Private schools:
International School of France / L'Ermitage (preschool to senior high)
 Sainte-Marie (preschool and elementary)
 Ecole Montessori Internationale

See also
Communes of the Yvelines department

References

External links

 Local website (in English)
Official website (in French)
Tourist Office  (multi-lingual)
Pictures and history of Maisons-Laffitte ( French)

Communes of Yvelines